Finnish School in Japan, nicknamed JASUKO, was a Finnish international school in Ōtsu, Shiga Prefecture, Japan. It served grades 1-11, and later Kindergarten-6.

History
The Finnish Free Foreign Mission established the school, which was originally intended for the sons and daughters of Finnish missionaries. Jasuko opened the fall of 1964 in a church in Chausuyama. Other missionary organizations, including the Finnish Lutheran Mission (FLM), the Finnish Lutheran Overseas Mission (FLOM), and the Lutheran Evangelical Association of Finland (LEAF), joined the efforts to run the school. Parents and volunteers built a structure that the school used until 1987. The peak enrollment was 43 students, most of whom were boarding students, in the spring of 1987. That year a new classroom building and dormitory opened.

The school population declined as the number of missionaries decreased in the 1990s. The school closed when the missionary cooperation ceased in 2003. In 2006 the school reopened as a trilingual Japanese-Finnish-English school but it closed again in 2008.

Joona Kallio, a former student, designed a logo for the school's 50 year anniversary. The "5" appears like the Japanese hiragana "ち" and the colors used are those of the flag of Finland.

References

Further reading

  Tahara, Masako (田原 昌子). "Music Education in Finland I : Case Study of Practical Applications at the Finnish School in Japan and Music Classes in Finnish Primary Schools" (Archive; フィンランドの音楽教育I : 日本フィンランド学校での指導とフィンランドの小学校音楽科授業視察を事例として). Journal of Poole Gakuin University (プール学院大学研究紀要) 49, 299–310, 2009–12. Poole Gakuin University. See profile at CiNii.
  "フィンランド人コミュニティー" (Archive). Embassy of Finland in Tokyo - The Japanese page discusses the Finnish school; this information is not in the English version of the page.

International schools in Japan
Finnish international schools
Education in Shiga Prefecture
Elementary schools in Japan
Buildings and structures in Ōtsu
Finland–Japan relations